Doug Payne (born December 2, 1981) is an American equestrian.

Payne was part of the American gold medal-winning eventing team at the 2019 Pan American Championships as well as finishing fourth in the individual competition in Lima, Peru. He has been selected to compete for the United States in the delayed 2020 Summer Games in Tokyo. He was the highest placed member of Team USA.

Payne might be best known in the discipline of Eventing as he has countless wins and top placings at all levels including a national championship at the Kentucky CCI5*.

In the Hunter and Jumper disciplines, he has multiple top placings at all levels National and FEI Grand Prix’s through CSI**** including the $100,000 Hits Grand Prix title as well as numerous top placings at National and International Hunter Derbies. In Dressage he has had success through FEI Intermediaire I and a USDF Silver Medal.

He has been profiled in and contributed to countless national publications and media outlets. Along with Jim Wofford, Doug produced the acclaimed 'the Rider's Eye' instructional DVD. In 2014 he published 'The Problem Horse Repair Manual'.

Officially Doug held USEF Judge, Technical Delegate and USEA ICP certifications for 10 years before relinquishing due to his extensive competition schedule. He was a graduate ‘A’ pony clubber from Somerset Hills Pony Club.

Along with his wife Jessica, also a 5* event rider, they run PE3S in Rougemont, NC. Outside of horses Doug holds a Mechanical Engineering degree from Rochester Institute of Technology and is an instrument rated Pilot.

Personal life
Payne was born in Morristown, New Jersey. He graduated from Voorhees High School in 2000 and has a mechanical engineering degree from Rochester Institute of Technology. Payne and his wife, Jessica, have two children, a son named Hudson and a daughter named Abby and live in Rougemont, North Carolina and Aiken, South Carolina.

References

1981 births
Living people
American male equestrians
American event riders
Equestrians at the 2019 Pan American Games
Pan American Games gold medalists for the United States
Pan American Games medalists in equestrian
Medalists at the 2019 Pan American Games
Olympic equestrians of the United States
Equestrians at the 2020 Summer Olympics
Rochester Institute of Technology alumni
People from Morristown, New Jersey
Sportspeople from Morris County, New Jersey
Voorhees High School alumni